46 South End, located in South Croydon, is Croydon's oldest surviving shop. The building is Grade II listed, dating back to the 17th century. The building retains its original timber framing and the front has distinctive and attractive elevations. The rear of the building is partly of modern construction. Since 1985 it has been home to Just Flutes, a music shop.

History
The original nature of the building, or who early occupants were is unknown. Records of street directories dating back to 1851 give the names E.C. Johnson & Thorpe, though no detail of the usage of the premises at the time. After an unoccupied period, the shop was a pork butchers for around 20 years.

From 1900 for 58 years, it was lived in by J. Gladwish, who established Gladwish's, a grocery and provisions shop.

In 1962 the property was bought by Mr Brian Trengove. He moved his business, Trengove Antiques, from a previous shop, which was demolished to make way for the Croydon Flyover. On several occasions, attempts at selling the property were made as seen by a newspaper article, dated October 6, 1982

Alterations
It is thought that at some point in the 1950s, the southern portion of the original house was demolished, and a three-storey building erected in its place.

Modern Day Status

In 1998 the building was purchased by Mr Jonathan Myall after moving from his existing shop in Coulsdon. The building is now used as a woodwind and brass specialist music retail outlet, Just Flutes, with an internationally renowned main speciality in flutes.

References

External links
 Heritage Gateway
 Just Flutes

Buildings and structures in the London Borough of Croydon